The Sion Hillock Fort is a fort in Mumbai (Bombay), India. It was built under the regime of the English East India Company, between 1669 and 1677, atop a conical hillock when Gerard Aungier was the Governor of Bombay. It was notified in 1925 as a Grade I Heritage structure. When it was built, the fort marked the boundary between British-held Parel island and the Portuguese held Salsette Island that lay to the north across the creek.

The hillock is situated 500 metres from the Sion railway station. At the base of the hill is the Mumbai Circle office of the Archaeological Survey of India, and a garden – the Pandit Jawaharlal Nehru Udyan. Nearby forts include the Riwa Fort and Sewri Fort.

The fort is dilapidated and a collection of broken stone steps, scattered walls and ruins, overrun by trees and ground cover. The fort wall has a small room on top. A series of pathways lead to it. The fort offers a panoramic view, overlooking the salt pans in the Thane Creek. However vandalism and apathy have taken their toll on the structure. Restoration of the fort had begun in 2009 but was stopped mid-way due to paucity of funds.

Gallery

See also 
 History of Bombay under British rule
 List of forts in Maharashtra

References 

Archaeological sites in Maharashtra
History of Mumbai
1670s establishments in the British Empire